José dos Santos Lopes (1 November 1910 or 25 February 1911 – 28 August 1996) known as Zéca Lopes, was a Brazilian football player. He played for Brazil national team at the 1938 FIFA World Cup finals.

References

1910s births
1996 deaths
Brazilian footballers
Brazil international footballers
1938 FIFA World Cup players
Association football forwards
People from Batatais